The Whitehall Worrier is a British comedy television series which first aired on BBC One in 1967. Revolving around the career of one of the minister's in Harold Wilson's Labour government, the series was gentle in style and closer to a traditional farce than more contemporary satire.

All episodes are now considered to be lost.

Main cast
 Robert Coote as  Rt. Hon. Mervyn Pugh
 Moira Lister as Janet Pugh
 Jonathan Cecil as Roger Deere
 Nan Munro as Miss Dempster
 Arthur Howard as Mr. Harrison
 Barbara Ogilvie as Mrs. Frome
 Karl Lanchbury as David Pugh
 Daphne Anderson as  Mrs. Nicholson

References

Bibliography
 Steven Fielding. A State of Play: British Politics on Screen, Stage and Page, from Anthony Trollope to The Thick of It. A&C Black, 2014.

External links
 

BBC television comedy
1967 British television series debuts
1967 British television series endings
1960s British comedy television series
English-language television shows